The russet bush warbler (Locustella mandelli) is a songbird species. Formerly placed in the "Old World warbler" assemblage, it is now placed in the newly recognized family Locustellidae. B. mandelli was until recently considered a subspecies of B. seebohmi, and the name "russet bush warbler" was applied to the entire species complex. After this was split up, Benguet bush warbler was proposed as a new name for B. seebohmi proper. The species is found in southeast Asia.

The scientific name commemorates the Italian naturalist Louis Mandelli.

References

russet bush warbler
Birds of Bhutan
Birds of Northeast India
Birds of South China
Birds of Myanmar
Birds of Thailand
Birds of Laos
Birds of Vietnam
russet bush warbler